Ankita Raina and Karman Thandi were the defending champions but Thandi chose not to participate. Raina partnered alongside Bibiane Schoofs, but lost in the quarterfinals to Lee Ya-hsuan and Wu Fang-hsien.

Lee and Wu went on to win the title, defeating Dalila Jakupović and Danka Kovinić in the final, 4–6, 6–4, [10–7].

Seeds

Draw

Draw

References

External Links
Main Draw

OEC Taipei WTA Challenger - Doubles
Taipei WTA Ladies Open